Smucker is a surname. Notable people with the surname include:

Barbara Smucker (1915–2003), American children's author
Jerome Monroe Smucker (1858–1948), American businessman, founder of The J.M. Smucker Company
Lloyd Smucker (born 1964), American politician, member of the U.S. House of Representatives from Pennsylvania
Mark Smucker (born 1969), CEO of The J.M. Smucker Company

Americanized surnames
German-language surnames